The Metal Masters Tour was a 17 date concert tour of arenas across North America in August 2008 featuring Judas Priest promoting their album Nostradamus, Motörhead promoting Motörizer, Heaven & Hell promoting The Rules of Hell and Testament promoting The Formation of Damnation.

Tour dates

Setlists

Testament setlist
 "Over the Wall"
 "The New Order"
 "More Than Meets the Eye"
 "Henchmen Ride"
 "The Formation of Damnation"

Note: 4 other songs varied from show to show, including "Electric Crown" and "Practice What You Preach"

Motörhead setlist
 "Doctor Rock" or "Rock Out"
 "Stay Clean"
 "Be My Baby"
 "Killers"
 "Metropolis"
 "Over the Top"
 "In the Name of Tragedy" (with drum solo)
 "Going to Brazil" or "Just 'Cos You Got the Power"
 "Killed by Death"
 "Ace of Spades"
 "Overkill"

Heaven & Hell setlist
 "E5150"
 "The Mob Rules"
 "Children of the Sea"
 "I"
 "Sign of the Southern Cross"
 "Ear in the Wall" (only played at first show)
 "Vinny Appice Drum Solo"
 "Time Machine"
 "Falling off the Edge of the World"
 "Tony Iommi Guitar Solo"
 "Die Young"
 "Heaven and Hell" (extended)

Encore
 "Neon Knights" (Not performed at some dates due to technical difficulties)

Judas Priest setlist
 "Dawn of Creation" (Intro)
 "Prophecy"
 "Metal Gods"
 "Eat Me Alive"
 "Between The Hammer and the Anvil"
 "Devil's Child"
 "Breaking the Law"
 "Hell Patrol"
 "Death" (not played at some dates)
 "Dissident Aggressor"
 "Angel"
 "The Hellion" (Intro)
 "Electric Eye"
 "Rock Hard Ride Free"
 "Sinner" (not played at some dates)
 "Painkiller"

Encore
 "Hell Bent for Leather"
 "The Green Manalishi (With the Two Prong Crown)"
 "You've Got Another Thing Comin'"

External links
 Motörhead official website
 Judas Priest official website
 Testament official site
 Metal Masters - August 7, 2008 Bristow VA Nissan Pavilion
 HEAVEN AND HELL, JUDAS PRIEST: Setlists For 'The Metal Masters Tour' Kick-Off Revealed

References

2008 concert tours
Heaven & Hell (band) concert tours
Judas Priest concert tours
Motörhead concert tours
Testament (band) concert tours